Jan Gałuszka (2 June 1903 – 1981) was a Polish wrestler. He competed in the men's Greco-Roman light heavyweight at the 1928 Summer Olympics.

References

1903 births
1981 deaths
Polish male sport wrestlers
Olympic wrestlers of Poland
Wrestlers at the 1928 Summer Olympics
Sportspeople from Gliwice